The University of Picardy Jules Verne (French: Université de Picardie Jules Verne; UPJV) is a  public university located in the former Picardy region of France (now part of Hauts-de-France).

It consists of several campuses located in the towns of Amiens, Beauvais, Cuffies, Saint-Quentin, Creil, and Laon.

The university is part of the University of Lille Nord de France group.

History 
The University of Picardy Jules Verne was established in 1970 as a successor to the former University of Amiens. It was initially simply called the University of Picardy during its first two decades, until 1991 when writer Jules Verne's named was added. Verne spent much of his life in Amiens. What started as a small university now has over 30,000 students across all campuses. The university celebrated its 50th anniversary in 2019-2020.

Organisation  
The university is organised into five main faculties or groupings each with a number of schools or institutes:

Arts, Lettres, Langues
 UFR des Arts
 UFR de Langues et Cultures Étrangères
 UFR des Lettres

Droit, Économie, Gestion
 UFR de Droit et de Science Politique
 UFR d'Économie et de Gestion
 De tout et n'importe quoi !
 Institut d'Administration des Entreprises (IAE)
 Institut de Préparation à l'Administration Générale (IPAG)

ESPE, Antenne et IUT
 Antenne Universitaire de Beauvais (AUB)
 École Supérieure du Professorat et de l'Éducation (ESPE)
 Institut Universitaire de Technologie d'Amiens
 Institut Universitaire de Technologie de l'Aisne
 Institut Universitaire de Technologie de l'Oise

Sciences Humaines et Sociales
 UFR d'Histoire et de Géographie
 UFR Sciences Humaines, Sociales et Philosophie

Sciences, Technologie, Santé
 UFR de Médecine
 Institut d'Ingénierie de la Santé - 2IS
 UFR de Pharmacie
 UFR des Sciences
 UFR des Sciences et Techniques des Activités Physiques et Sportives - STAPS
 Institut Supérieur des Sciences et Techniques - INSSET

Notable faculty 
 Jacqueline Lévi-Valensi (1932-2004) - specialist in the work of Albert Camus 
 Andrée Ehresmann (born 1935) - mathematician specialising in category theory
 Nadine-Josette Chaline (born 1938) - specialist in religious history
 Jean-Michel Macron (born 1950) - neurologist; father of Emmanuel Macron
 Jean-Marie Tarascon (born 1953) - chemist
 Brigitte Fouré (born 1955) - university lecturer and former government minister
 Laurence Bertrand Dorléac (born 1957) - art historian
 Enzo Traverso (born 1957) - Italian scholar of European intellectual history
 Nikolay Nenovsky (born 1963) - Bulgarian economist, working in the fields of monetary theory and policy, monetary history and history of economic thought
 Pablo Martín Asuero (born 1967) - Spanish scholar from the Basque Country. He specialises in Middle Eastern history 
 Alain Bui (born 1969) - specialist in information technology; president of Versailles Saint-Quentin-en-Yvelines University
 Fabien Danesi - art historian
 Nicole Jacques-Lefevre - Professor of Literature who specialises in the study of demonological texts of the Enlightenment in the eighteenth century including werewolves and lycanthropy
 Jean-Paul Cointet - historian

Notable alumni
 Daniel Ona Ondo (born 1945) - Gabonese politician who was Prime Minister of Gabon from January 2014 to September 2016
 Calliope Spanou - Greek academic who served from 2011 to 2015 as the Greek Ombudsman

See also

 List of colleges and universities
 List of public universities in France by academy
 Amiens

References

External links
University of Picardy Website 

Educational institutions established in 1970
Buildings and structures in Amiens
1970 establishments in France
Buildings and structures in Somme (department)
Universities and colleges in Amiens
University of Picardy Jules Verne